Dwayne or Dewayne is a traditionally male name. It is Gaelic in origin, deriving from the Irish saint Dubhán.

History
St. Dubhán was an Irish monk who established an abbey in Hook Head, Ireland during the 5th century. As a surname it is O'Dubhain, or Dubhan. Dubhain was a popular given name in 16th century southern Ireland. Its Anglicized form is Dwayne or Duane. In Irish "dubh" means "black".

Variant forms
 Dewayne
 Dewaine
 Dewane
 Duaine
 Duane 
 Duwain
 Duwaine
 Duwayne
 Dwain
 Dwaine
 Dwane

Given name
 Dwayne Abernathy (born 1976), American musician and record producer better known as Dem Jointz
 Dwayne Allen (born 1990), American football player
 Dwayne Alons (1946–2014), American politician
 Dwayne Ambusley (born 1980), Jamaican footballer
 Dwayne Anderson (born 1986), American basketball player 
 Dwayne Anderson (American football) (born 1961), American football player
 Dwayne Andreas (1918–2016), American business executive and political donor
 Dwayne Armstrong (born 1971), American football player
 Dwayne Bacon (born 1995), American basketball player
 Dwayne Barker (born 1983), English rugby league footballer
 Dwayne Benjamin (economist) (born 1961), Canadian economist
 Dwayne Benjamin (basketball) (born 1993), American basketball player
 Dwayne Blakley (born 1979), American football player
 Dwayne Bohac (born 1966), American politician
 Dwayne Bowe (born 1984), American football player
 Dwayne Bravo (born 1983), Trinidadian cricketer 
 Dwayne Broyles (born 1982), American basketball player
 Dwayne Burno (1970–2013), American jazz bassist
 Dwayne Cameron (born 1981), New Zealand actor, director, and screenwriter
 Dwayne Carey-Hill, American animation director 
 Dwayne Carswell (born 1972), American football player
 Dwayne Carter (born 1982), American rapper better known as Lil Wayne
 Dwayne Cowan (born 1985), English sprinter
 Dwayne Croft, American operatic baritone
 Dwayne Crompton (1946–2022), American early child professional
 Dwayne A. Day, American space historian
 Dwyane Demmin (born 1975), Trinidad and Tobago association football defender
 Dwayne De Rosario (born 1978), Canadian soccer player
 Dwayne Haskins (1997–2022), American football quarterback
 Dwayne Henry (born 1962), American baseball player
 Dwayne Hickman (born 1934), American actor, television director, and network executive
 Dwayne Hill (born 1966), Canadian actor
 Dwayne Hollis (born 1989), American football player
 Dwayne Johnson (born 1972), American actor and professional wrestler, also known as The Rock
 Dwayne Jones (disambiguation), various people
 Dwayne King (disambiguation), various people
 Dwayne McDuffie (1962–2011), American writer of comic books and television
 Dwayne Rudd (born 1976), American football player
 Dwayne Russell (born 1965), Australian rules footballer
 Dwayne Smith (born 1983), cricketer from Barbados
 Dwyane Wade (born 1982), American basketball player
 Dwayne Washington (disambiguation), various people

Alternative spelling 
 Dewayne Alexander, American football coach
 DeWayne Antonio Craddock (1978–2019), American mass shooter
 DeWayne Barrett (born 1981), Jamaican sprinter
 Dewayne Blackwell (1936–2021), American songwriter
 Dewayne Bowden (born 1982), New Zealand cricketer
 DeWayne Bruce (born 1962), American professional wrestler
 DeWayne Buice (born 1957), American baseball pitcher
 Dewayne Bunch (Kentucky politician) (1962–2012), American politician
 Dewayne Bunch (Tennessee politician) (born 1959), American politician
 DeWayne Burns (born 1972), American politician
 Dewayne Cherrington (born 1990), American football player
 Dewayne Dedmon (born 1989), American basketball player
 DeWayne Dotson (born 1971), American football player
 Dewayne Douglas (1931–2000), American football player
 Dewayne Dwyer (born 1989), United States Virgin Islands soccer player
 Dewayne Everettsmith, Australian singer
 Dewayne Freeman (born 1955), American politician
 DeWayne Lee Harris (born 1963), American serial killer
 Dewayne Hendrix (born 1995), American football player
 Dewayne Hill (born 1950), American politician
 DeWayne Jackson (born 1990), American basketball player
 Dewayne Jefferson (born 1979), American basketball player
 DeWayne Jessie (born 1951), American actor
 Dewayne Johnson (born 1970s), American groundkeeper who won lawsuits over Monsanto (Roundup cancer case)
 DeWayne Keeter (1944–1975), American motorcycle speedway rider
 DeWayne "Dewey" King (born 1925), American football player and coach
 DeWayne Lewis (born 1985), American football player
 DeWayne "Tiny" Lund (1929–1975), American stock car racer
 DeWayne McKinney, American businessman wrongfully convicted of murder
 DeWayne McKnight (born 1954), American funk guitarist
 DeWayne Patmon (born 1979), American football player
 DeWayne Patterson (born 1984), American football player
 Dewayne Pemberton (born 1956), American politician
 Dewayne Perkins, American comedian, actor, and writer
 Dewayne E. Perry, American engineer
 Dewayne Robertson (born 1981), American football player
 DeWayne Russell (born 1994), American basketball player
 DeWayne Scales (born 1958), American basketball player
 Dewayne Staats (born 1952), American sportscaster
 DeWayne Vaughn (born 1959), American baseball pitcher
 DeWayne Walker (born 1960), American football player and coach
 Dewayne Washington (born 1972), American football player
 Dewayne White (born 1979), American football player
 Dewayne T. Williams (1949–1968), United States Marine and posthumous Medal of Honor recipient
 DeWayne Wise (born 1978), American baseball player
 DeWayne Woods (born 1975), American gospel singer-songwriter and musician
 Dwaine O. Cowan (1935–2006), American chemist
 Terry DeWayne Fair, American-Israeli basketball player
 Kenneth Dwane Bowersox, American astronaut

Fictional characters
 President Dwayne Elizondo Mountain Dew Herbert Camacho, character portrayed by Terry Crews in the film Idiocracy
 Dwayne Sr. and Dwayne "Junior" Jr., two characters from The Ridonculous Race
Dwayne T. Robinson, deputy chief of the Los Angeles Police Department in the film Die Hard
Dwayne Hoover, a character in the film Little Miss Sunshine
Dwayne, a vampire from the film The Lost Boys

Surname

 Johnathan Dwayne (born 1963), Puerto Rican musician, composer, and artist
 Sidney DeWayne (also known as Sid Johnson), songwriter, producer and personal manager

See also 
 
 
 
 Duane (given name)
 Duane (surname)

Masculine given names
Gaelic-language given names
English masculine given names